Events in the year 2023 in Equatorial Guinea.

Incumbents 

 President: Teodoro Obiang Nguema Mbasogo
 Prime Minister: Francisco Pascual Obama Asue

Events 
Ongoing — COVID-19 pandemic in Equatorial Guinea

 4 January – The Supreme Court of Spain says that it will investigate two sons of Equatorial Guinean president Teodoro Obiang Nguema Mbasogo over the kidnapping and torture of two Spanish citizens who oppose Obiang's rule.

 7 February – An outbreak of an unknown illness causing hemorrhagic fever is reported. This was later determined to be Marburg virus. See main article at 2023 Marburg virus disease outbreak in Equatorial Guinea.
 13 February – The Equatoguinean health ministry confirms an outbreak of the Marburg virus in the country, which has killed nine people within the last month.

References 

 
2020s in Equatorial Guinea
Years of the 21st century in Equatorial Guinea
Equatorial Guinea
Equatorial Guinea